Tut (also Romanized as Tūt and Toot) is a village in Hastijan Rural District, in the Central District of Delijan County, Markazi Province, Iran. At the 2006 census, its population was 72, in 19 families.

References 

Populated places in Delijan County